China Airlines Flight 334 was a Boeing 747-2R7F/SCD freighter aircraft that was hijacked by pilot Wang Hsi-chueh on May 3, 1986, while en route to Don Mueang, Thailand. Wang managed to subdue the two other crew members and changed course to land the 747 in Guangzhou, where he defected to the People's Republic of China. The incident forced the Chiang Ching-kuo government in Taiwan to reverse its Three Noes policy in regard to contacting the communist government in mainland China, and Chiang dispatched several delegates to Hong Kong to negotiate with mainland officials for the return of the aircraft and crew. The incident was credited as a catalyst in renewing cross-strait relations between mainland China and Taiwan.

Aircraft
The aircraft was a Boeing 747-2R7F/SCD freighter, registration B-198, built in September 1980 originally for Cargolux (as LX-ECV "City of Esch-sur-Alzette"). The ROC Ministry of Transportation Civil Aviation Authority acquired the aircraft in June 1985 and then leased it to China Airlines.
On 29 December 1991, this aircraft, later operating as China Airlines Flight 358, crashed into the side of a hill near Wanli, Taiwan after the separation of its number three and four engines, killing all five crew on board.

Incident

The following times are all in the Beijing/Taipei/Hong Kong time zone (UTC+8).

May 3
5:50 AM: China Airlines freighter aircraft took off from Singapore, headed for Bangkok.
2:45 PM: Wang Hsi-chueh attacked Tung Kuang-hsing with an emergency axe, and also subdued and handcuffed him.
2:50 PM: Chiu Ming-chih, who came back from the restroom, started to fight with Wang.
2:50 PM: Hong Kong ATC, upon discovering that China Airlines 334 has not descended to the appropriate height, ordered it to descend.
3:00 PM: About  from Hong Kong FLIR, Wang began calling Guangzhou Baiyun airport control tower, to the surprise of Hong Kong ATC. The ATC staff requested the final landing destination.
3:07 PM: Scheduled arrival time at Hong Kong Kai Tak; HK ATC observes the plane continued to fly north.
3:08 PM: Another crew member threatened to cause a dangerous situation on the plane. A stall warning was issued at altitude  AMSL. Chiu raised the flaps, risking crashing into the sea.
3:13 PM: Wang received flight assistance through official Chinese civil aviation, who called Guangzhou Baiyun International Airport.
3:45–3:50 PM: Plane landed and pilots were apprehended, giving conflicting stories.

Aftermath
By forcing the ROC (Taiwan) to communicate with PRC (China), Flight 334 was the first step in the thawing of relations. It effectively ended the Three Noes policy and ultimately led to the reunification of families across the straits a year later and has led to officially establishing the Three Links that were originally outlined in a 1979 PRC proposal by 2008. In 1987 the ROC officially ended martial law.

The accident aircraft in question, under flight number 358, would eventually crash after takeoff when the right side engines on the aircraft separated on 21 December 1991.

Notes

References

Accidents and incidents involving the Boeing 747
1986 in Taiwan
Cross-Strait relations
Aviation accidents and incidents in 1986
334
1986 disasters in China
Aircraft hijackings in China
Taiwanese defectors
May 1986 events in Asia